Sukhumvit Road, or Highway 3, is a major road in Thailand, and a major surface road of Bangkok and other cities.  It follows a coastal route from Bangkok to Khlong Yai District, Trat border to Koh Kong, Cambodia.

Sukhumvit Road is named after the fifth chief of the Department of Highways, Phra Bisal Sukhumvit. It is one of the four major highways of Thailand, along with Phahonyothin Road (Highway 1), Mittraphap Road (Highway 2) and Phetkasem Road (Highway 4).

Route 
Sukhumvit Road begins in Bangkok, as a continuation of Rama I and Phloen Chit Roads which span Pathum Wan District. Starting from where the boundaries of the districts of Khlong Toei, Pathum Wan and Watthana meet, it runs the entire length of the border between Khlong Toei and Watthana, then passes through Phra Khanong and Bang Na districts.

It then crosses the border between Bangkok and Samut Prakan Province and subsequently continues east through Chachoengsao Province, south through Chonburi Province skirting the Khao Khiao Massif, east through Rayong Province, south-east through Chanthaburi Province, and ends at Ban Hat Lek village in Trat Province.

In Chonburi Province it passes through the towns of Chonburi, Laem Chabang, Bang Lamung township, Si Racha, and Pattaya.

Bangkok and other parts 

In the capital, Sukhumvit Road serves as a main commercial street, and this section is often congested, even at late evening or early morning hours. The Chalerm Mahanakhon Expressway has an exit at Soi 1.  Ratchadaphisek Road crosses Sukhumvit at the Asok (Asoke) intersection.

The Sukhumvit area of Bangkok is easily accessible on the Skytrain Sukhumvit Line, which runs from Khu Khot in Lam Luk Ka, Pathum Thani through the Silom Line interchange at Siam up to Kheha in the centre of Samut Prakan. The MRT's Sukhumvit Station interchanges with the Skytrain at Asok.

The Sois are numbered from West to East, with odd numbers branching off North-East of Sukhumvit, and even numbers branching off South-West.

The area between Sukhumvit Soi 1 and Sukhumvit Soi 63 is popular as residential area for western expatriates.  Japanese nationals tend to prefer from Soi 21 Asok intersection upwards, especially Soi Thong Lo. Rentals tend to be higher in the even numbered streets between Soi 8 and Soi 28 and in the odd numbered streets between Soi 15 and Soi 39. Soi 12 is occupied mainly by Indian expatriates, see Phahurat. The beginning of Soi 12 also has a Koreatown with several Korean restaurants and grocery stores. Koreatown is across the road from the Korean Cultural Centre.

The areas of Soi Cowboy (between Soi 21 Asok and Soi 23) and Nana Entertainment Plaza (Soi 4) are packed full of gogo bars and other places of prostitution. Restaurants of various levels of luxury exist all along the road, as well as hotels including famous names such as The Westin, JW Marriott, Sheraton, Ramada Hotel and Suites Bangkok Sukhumvit, and Four Points by Sheraton. Also several shopping malls are found, like the upscale The Emporium shopping center. It also harbours the eastern bus station at Soi 63 Ekkamai.

Major sois off Sukhumvit Road in Bangkok and other parts:

See also 

 Thai highway network

External links 
Video guide to Sukhumvit Road

Beginners Guide for Sukhumvit Road Bangkok

National highways in Thailand
Streets in Bangkok